Xuân Hinh (born April 8, 1960) is Vietnamese vocalist of chèo.


See also
 Chèo

References

1960 births
Living people
People from Bắc Ninh province
20th-century Vietnamese male singers